{{DISPLAYTITLE:C3H7N}}
The molecular formula C3H7N may refer to:

 Acetone imine
 Allylamine (2-propen-1-amine)
 Azetidine (trimethylenimine)
 Cyclopropylamine
 2-Methylaziridine
 N-Methylaziridine